Ahmadabad-e Kalij, also rendered as Ahmadabad-e Kalich, may refer to:
 Ahmadabad-e Kalij-e Olya
 Ahmadabad-e Kalij-e Sofla